The 2013–2014 season of the Russian Bandy Super League was played from November 2013 until March 2014, when the Russian champions were named after a play-off.

Teams

League table

Knock-out stage

Matches

References

2013 in Russian sport
2014 in Russian sport
2013 in bandy
2014 in bandy
Seasons in Russian bandy